Abstract painting is a 1998 abstract oil painting by Victor Pasmore.

Description 
The painting is an oil on canvas with dimensions of 200 x 192 centimeters.
It is in the collection of MUŻA in Valletta, Malta.

Analysis 
It is a large abstract painting, characteristic of his style. It was the artist's last work, and was donated to the National Museum of Fine Arts, Malta, by the artist's family.

References 

Abstract art
1998 paintings
Paintings in Malta
Paintings by Victor Pasmore